The Taiyuan–Jiaozuo or Taijiao railway, is a major trunkline railroad in northern China.  The railway is named after its terminal cities, Taiyuan in Shanxi Province and Jiaozuo in Henan Province.  The line,  in length,  lies mainly in Shanxi, running from Taiyuan in the center of the province to Jincheng in the southeast corner.  Jiaozuo is just across the southern border from Shanxi in northern Henan.  The Taijiao railway was built from 1970 to 1978.  Major cities and towns along route include Taiyuan, Yuci, Jinzhong, Changzhi and Jincheng.

Rail connections
Taiyuan: Datong–Puzhou railway, Shijiazhuang–Taiyuan railway
Changzhi: Handan–Changzhi railway, Shanxi–Henan–Shandong railway
Jiaozuo: (Yueshan station): Jiaozuo–Liuzhou railway, Xinxiang–Yueshan railway

See also

 List of railways in China

References

Railway lines in China
Rail transport in Henan
Rail transport in Shanxi